Diedra is a genus of moths belonging to the family Tortricidae.

Species
Diedra calocedrana Rubinoff & Powell, 1999
Diedra cockerellana (Kearfott, 1907)
Diedra intermontana Rubinoff & Powell, 1999
Diedra leuschneri Rubinoff & Powell, 1999
Diedra wielgusi (Clarke, 1991)

See also
List of Tortricidae genera

References

 , 1989 (1990): A new species of Argyrotaenia from Arizona (Lepidoptera: Tortricidae). Journal of Research on the Lepidoptera 28 (1-2): 97-99.

External links
tortricidae.com

Archipini
Tortricidae genera